The 2008–09 Macedonian Football Cup was the 17th season of Macedonia's football knockout competition. FK Rabotnichki defended their title, having won their second title.

Competition calendar

First round
The draw was held on 21 June 2008 in Skopje. Matches were played on 17 September 2008.

|colspan="3" style="background-color:#97DEFF" align=center|17 September 2008

|}

Second round
The draw was held on 22 September 2008 in Skopje. The first legs were played on 22 October 2008 and second on 29 and 30 October 2008.

|}

Quarter-finals
The draw was held on 6 November 2008 in Skopje. The first legs were played on 26 November 2008 and the second were played on 7 and 10 December 2008.

|}

Semi-finals
The draw was held on 25 December 2008 in Skopje. The first legs were played on 8 April 2009 and the second were played on 6 May 2009.

Summary

|}

Matches

Rabotnichki won 3–2 on aggregate.

Makedonija GP won 2–1 on aggregate.

Final

See also
2008–09 Macedonian First Football League
2008–09 Macedonian Second Football League

External links
 2008–09 Macedonian Football Cup at FFM.mk

Macedonia
Cup
Macedonian Football Cup seasons